Hyglac is an early Germanic personal name, known through northern Europe, Scandinavia and Anglo-Saxon England. It derives from Proto-Germanic *Hugilaikaz, from *hugjaną "courage" (see the name Hugh) + -laikaz ("ritual").

The following people are known by the name:
 Saint Hyglac, Anglo-Saxon Saint
 King Hygelac (Beowulf)

References

Germanic given names